The 2019 Cal Poly Mustangs football team represented California Polytechnic State University in the 2019 NCAA Division I FCS football season. The Mustangs were led by 11th-year head coach Tim Walsh and played their home games at Alex G. Spanos Stadium. They were members of the Big Sky Conference. They finished the season 3–8, 2–6 in Big Sky play to finish in a five-way tie for ninth place. On November 25, 2019, Tim Walsh announced his retirement. He finished with a 176–148 record in 29 seasons.

Previous season
The Mustangs finished the 2018 season 5–6, 4–4 in Big Sky play to finish in a tie for sixth place.

Preseason

Big Sky preseason poll
The Big Sky released their preseason media and coaches' polls on July 15, 2019. The Mustangs were picked to finish in ninth place in both polls.

Preseason All–Big Sky team
The Mustangs did not have any players selected to the preseason all-Big Sky team.

Schedule

Source:

Despite also being a member of the Big Sky, the game at Weber State was a non-conference game and had no effect on the Big Sky standings.

Game summaries

San Diego

at Weber State

at Oregon State

at Southern Utah

Montana State

at UC Davis

North Dakota

Sacramento State

at Idaho

Eastern Washington

at Northern Colorado

References

Cal Poly
Cal Poly Mustangs football seasons
Cal Poly Mustangs football